Adimar Vila Nova Neves (born 28 May 1990), known as Adimar Neves or simply Adimar, is a São Toméan footballer who plays as a central defender for Finnish club and the São Tomé and Príncipe national team. He also holds Portuguese citizenship.

International career
Adimar Neves made his international debut on 4 June 2016, when he played entirely in a loss Africa Cup of Nations qualifier against Cape Verde.

References

External links 
 
 

1990 births
Living people
São Tomé and Príncipe footballers
Association football central defenders
São Tomé and Príncipe international footballers
São Tomé and Príncipe expatriate footballers
São Tomé and Príncipe expatriate sportspeople in Portugal
Expatriate footballers in Portugal
São Tomé and Príncipe expatriate sportspeople in Finland
Expatriate footballers in Finland